Guido Caprino (born 3 January 1974) is an Italian stage, film and television actor.

Life and career 
Born in Taormina, Caprino grew up in Nizza di Sicilia and graduated as a dental technician in Messina. He then moved to Milan, where he worked as an advertising model. 

After attending several drama courses, Caprino got his first roles on stage and on television in the mid-2000s.  He had his breakout in 2007, with the title role in the RAI TV-series Il commissario Manara.

Filmography

Films

Television

References

External links 
  

1974 births
20th-century Italian male actors 
21st-century Italian male actors
Italian male film actors
Italian male television actors
Italian male stage actors
Actors from the Province of Messina
People from Taormina
Living people